Daromin  is a village in the administrative district of Gmina Wilczyce, within Sandomierz County, Świętokrzyskie Voivodeship, in south-central Poland.

The village has a population of 480.

References

Daromin